Douglas "Doug" Wesley Ashdown (born 29 July 1942) is an Australian singer-songwriter who had a minor hit with "Winter in America", also known as "Leave Love Enough Alone", which reached No. 13 on the Dutch Singles Chart in 1978. In 1988 the song was covered by Dutch singer René Froger, and in 1994 by Australian group The Robertson Brothers.  Ashdown reached No. 46 on the Australian Kent Music Report with "The Saddest Song of All" released in August 1970. In 1977, his album Trees won the TV Week (an Australian television entertainment magazine) King of Pop Award for 'Best Album Cover'.

Biography
Douglas Wesley Ashdown was born in 1942 in Adelaide, South Australia and at the age of 17 he travelled to England to play in a rock band. In 1961 he was back in Adelaide and played guitar alongside Bobby Bright as vocalist in The Bowmen. By 1965, as a solo singer-songwriter, he released his first album, This Is Doug Ashdown. His 1960s popular singles were "Something Strange" in 1968, and in 1969, "Whole Lotta Shakin' Goin On" (cover of the Jerry Lee Lewis' hit).

In 1970, he signed with the independent label, Sweet Peach, and issued "The Saddest Song of All" in August which peaked at number 46 on the Kent Music Report. The song was written by Ashdown and Jim Stewart, who became his long-term producer and co-writer. The associated album, The Age of Mouse, was the first double LP album of original material released by an Australian. Ashdown and Stewart relocated to the United States, living in Nashville. While in Nashville, the pair co-wrote "Just Thank Me", for David Rogers, who released it in 1973—it peaked at No. 17 on the US Country Music Singles Chart. They also co-wrote "Leave Love Enough Alone" which Ashdown released in 1974 upon relocation to Sydney. He had a minor hit with it when it was renamed as "Winter in America" and released in 1976. It peaked at No.  3 in Brisbane, No. 14 in Melbourne and No. 30 in Sydney.

In 1977, his album, Trees won the TV Week, an Australian television entertainment magazine, King of Pop Award for 'Best Album Cover'. Ashdown also worked with science fiction writer/songwriter Terry Dowling on recordings of Dowling's song-cycle "Amberjack", about a stranded time traveller. Ashdown contributed lead vocals and guitar to six of the tracks of Dowling's song-cycle which were broadcast by the Australian Broadcasting Corporation in 1977.

He continued to release singles and albums and had minor chart success into the 1980s.

Discography

Studio albums

Live albums

Compilation albums

Charting singles

Awards

Australian Record Awards

|-
| 1975
| Leave Love Enough Alone
| Easy Listening Male Album of the Year
| 
|}

References

General
 
  Note: Archived [on-line] copy has limited functionality.

Specific

External links
 Official website
 [ Doug Ashdown] at Allmusic

1942 births
Australian country singers
Australian folk singers
Australian guitarists
Australian singer-songwriters
Living people